"Stand Up For Something" is a song written by Common and Diane Warren, performed by the former with singer Andra Day. The song was released as a lead single from the soundtrack album of 2017 film Marshall, and at the 90th Academy Awards received a nomination for Best Original Song.

Day and Common performed the song at the CMT Artists of the Year ceremony alongside Little Big Town, Lee Ann Womack and Danielle Bradbery. It was nominated for CMT Performance of the Year at the 2018 CMT Music Awards.

Accolades

References

External links
 "Stand Up For Something" at Oscars.org  
 
 "Stand Up For Something" lyrics at Genius

2017 singles
2017 songs
Songs written by Common (rapper)
Songs written by Diane Warren